Lewis Henry Little (March 19, 1817 – September 19, 1862) was a career United States Army officer and a Confederate brigadier general during the American Civil War. He served mainly in the Western Theater and was killed in action during the Battle of Iuka.

Early life and career
Little was born in Baltimore, Maryland to Peter Little and his wife Catherine on Mar. 19, 1817. He was a brother-in-law of Alexander E. Steen and son-in-law of Pitcairn Morrison. Little was commissioned a second lieutenant in the 5th U.S. Infantry in 1839 after graduating from West Point.  He served in the Mexican War and was awarded a brevet promotion to captain for his service at the Battle of Monterrey in 1846. He was promoted to captain in the regular army on August 20, 1847.

American Civil War
Little resigned his commission as a U.S. Army officer on May 7, 1861. He helped Sterling Price train the Missouri volunteers that soon joined the Southern armies. He entered the Confederate service as an infantry captain on March 16, 1861, but soon was made an artillery major that same month. Little was promoted to colonel on May 18 and served Price as his Adjutant General in the Missouri State Guard.

At the Battle of Pea Ridge on March 7, 1862, Little commanded the 1st Missouri Brigade in Price's division. In the thick of the first day's fighting near Elkhorn Tavern, he demonstrated competence and initiative. "During the course of the battle he gradually assumed more and more responsibility until he became the de facto commander of Price's division during the last hours that the Army of the West was on the field." His appointment to brigadier general occurred on April 12.

Little came east of the Mississippi River with Maj. Gen. Earl Van Dorn's army and served under Gen. P. G. T. Beauregard at Corinth. There, he caught malaria and was in poor health for the few remaining months of his life. Even so, he was regarded as "a thorough soldier and an excellent disciplinarian." At Corinth he was given command of the 1st Division in Price's Army of the West. His peers praised his division as well drilled and disciplined.

He led his division at the Battle of Iuka on September 19. At about 5:45 p.m., while sitting on his horse behind the front line and next to Sterling Price, he was struck in the head by a bullet and killed instantly. He is buried in Green Mount Cemetery in Baltimore.

See also
List of American Civil War generals (Confederate)

Notes

References
 Boatner, Mark Mayo, III. The Civil War Dictionary. New York: McKay, 1988. . First published New York, McKay, 1959.
 Cozzens, Peter. The Darkest Days of the War: The Battles of Iuka and Corinth. Chapel Hill: University of North Carolina Press, 1997. .
 Eicher, John H., and David J. Eicher, Civil War High Commands. Stanford: Stanford University Press, 2001. .
 Shea, William L. and Earl J. Hess. Pea Ridge: Civil War Campaign in the West. Chapel Hill: University of North Carolina Press, 1992. .
 Sifakis, Stewart. Who Was Who in the Civil War. New York: Facts On File, 1988. .
 Warner, Ezra J. Generals in Gray: Lives of the Confederate Commanders. Baton Rouge: Louisiana State University Press, 1959. .
 Embree, Joan. , National Park Service, 1990.

Confederate States Army brigadier generals
People of Maryland in the American Civil War
Confederate States of America military personnel killed in the American Civil War
Military personnel from Baltimore
Burials at Green Mount Cemetery
Missouri State Guard
1817 births
1862 deaths